The Government Technical Institute, Mawlamyine is an Institute of technology and engineering located in Mawlamyine, Mon State, Burma. It can graduate only Diploma of Technical.

History 
In 2014 December, Government Technical Institute (Mawlamyine) was founded by Ministry of Science and Technology. (Not to be confused with the previous Government Technological Institute from the other part of Mawlamyine later upgraded as Technological University (Mawlamyine)).

Location 
GTI Mawlamyine is located at Industrial Quarter, Mawlamyine, that was Computer University (Mawlamyine).

Departments 
Department of Civil Engineering
Department of Electronic and Communication Engineering
Department of Electrical Power Engineering
Department of Mechanical Engineering

Programs

See also
List of universities in Myanmar
Yenangyaung Government Technical Institute

References

External links
Ministry of Science and Technology

Technological universities in Myanmar